The 1998 Grand Prix de Tennis de Lyon was a men's tennis tournament played on indoor carpet courts at the Palais des Sports de Gerland in Lyon, France, and was part of the International Series of the 1998 ATP Tour. It was the 12th edition of the tournament and ran from 19 October until 26 October 1998. Fourth-seeded Àlex Corretja won the singles title.

Finals

Singles

 Àlex Corretja defeated  Tommy Haas 2–6, 7–6(8–6), 6–1
 It was Corretja's 4th title of the year and the 10th of his career.

Doubles

 Olivier Delaître /  Fabrice Santoro defeated  Tomás Carbonell /  Francisco Roig 6–2, 6–2
 It was Delaître's 4th title of the year and the 12th of his career. It was Santoro's 4th title of the year and the 6th of his career.

References

External links
 ITF tournament edition details

Grand Prix de Tennis de Lyon
1998
Grand Prix de Tennis de Lyon